Sic 'Em, Towser is a 1918 short comedy film featuring Harold Lloyd. It is believed to be lost.

Cast
 Harold Lloyd 
 Snub Pollard 
 Bebe Daniels 
 William Blaisdell
 Sammy Brooks
 Lige Conley (as Lige Cromley)
 William Gillespie
 Helen Gilmore
 Gus Leonard
 James Parrott
 Charles Stevenson (as Charles E. Stevenson)
 Dorothea Wolbert

See also
 Harold Lloyd filmography

References

External links

1918 films
1918 comedy films
1918 short films
1918 lost films
American silent short films
American black-and-white films
Silent American comedy films
American comedy short films
Films directed by Gilbert Pratt
Lost American films
Lost comedy films
1910s American films